Art et magie de la cuisine was a French television cooking show, it was created by the chef Raymond Oliver, and was co presented by Catherine Langeais.

The show was broadcast from December 6, 1954, to 1967 on RTF.

Origins

In 1953, RTF asked Raymond Oliver, the French chef and owner of Le Grand Véfour restaurant, to host with Catherine Langeais a program entitled Art et magie de la cuisine.

References

1954 French television series debuts
1967 French television series endings
Cooking television series
French-language television shows